Deh-e Pain-e Darb Kalat (also Romanized as Deh-e Pā’īn-e Darb Kalāt; also known as Deh-e Pā’īn) is a village in Sadat Mahmudi Rural District, Pataveh District, Dana County, Kohgiluyeh and Boyer-Ahmad Province, Iran. At the 2006 census, its population was 181, in 33 families.

References 

Populated places in Dana County